Shazza is the stage name of Magdalena Pańkowska, born May 29, 1967, in Pruszków, a female Polish singer-songwriter and occasional actress. She found fame in the 1990s with her massive disco polo hits such as "Baiao Bongo", "Bierz co chcesz", "Egipskie noce" or "Noc róży". Having been proclaimed "the queen of disco polo", Shazza remains one of the best-selling singers of the genre.

Career
At the end of the 1980s she joined a disco polo group, Toy Boys, with whom she recorded first albums in the early 1990s. Her career as a solo artist began in 1992 with an album Sex Appeal. She enjoyed success with songs like "Jesteś moim ideałem" and "Jambalaya Mix". In 1994 Shazza had her first major hit with "Baiao Bongo", a cover version of an old 50s song originally performed by Natasza Zylska. The album of the same name became a best-seller and the song "18 lat" also enjoyed popularity. Her videos were heavily aired in Disco Relax, a popular Sunday morning TV show.

The breakthrough in Shazza's career came in 1995. The song "Bierz co chcesz" became a massive hit and its music video is now considered cult. The track was included on her next album, Egipskie noce, which also included "Tak bardzo zakochani", "Miłość i zdrada" and popular title song. The album turned out her highest-selling record to date. It was followed by Noc róży in 1996, which presented more sophisticated sound. 1997 saw the release of Tak blisko nieba, her first album issued by a new record label. The biggest hit off the album was "Małe pieski dwa", and it also included a cover of ABBA's "Hasta Mañana". Her next album, Historia pewnej miłości, was another change of style and consisted of more dance-oriented songs. However, it didn't meet with such positive reception as her previous efforts had done.

In 1999 and 2000 Shazza released collections of her greatest hits. She also took part in a nude photo session for the Polish Playboy magazine. The issue with her on the cover turned out to be a big success. 

After signing up to EMI record label, Shazza released her next album Jestem sobą in 2001. It was a clear departure from the disco polo sound with which she'd been associated. Singles "Jestem sobą" and "Może to samba" were minor hits, but the sales of the album proved disappointing and the singer was dropped by the label. After this Shazza decided to take a break from music. She moved to the USA and made a modest comeback in 2007, when she re-recorded some of her most known hits.

Discography
1992: Sex Appeal
1993: Jambalaya Mix
1994: Baiao Bongo
1994: The Best of Shazza
1995: Egipskie noce
1996: Noc róży
1996: Złote przeboje
1997: Tak blisko nieba
1998: Historia pewnej miłości
1999: Najlepsze z najlepszych. Przeboje 1993 – 1999
2000: Platynowe przeboje
2001: Jestem sobą
2006: The Best – Egipskie noce
2008: Hity Disco Polo cz. 3 – The Best of Shazza

Acting
1996: Bara Bara
1999: Poniedziałek
2000: Sukces
2000: W tym domu straszy
2001: Wtorek

References 

1967 births
Living people
Polish women singers
Polish film actresses
Polish pop singers
20th-century Polish actresses